Ndian is a department of Southwest Region in Cameroon.

History 
Ndian division was formed in 1975 from parts of Kumba and Victoria divisions and is one of six administrative units that constitute the Southwest Region. Its headquarters is in Mundemba and other major towns include Ekondo Titi, Bamusso, Isangele, Toko, Bekora and Dikome Balue. The division is linked to other major towns of Cameroon (such as Kumba in the Meme) by the national road N16 and which passes through Ekondo Titi onwards to Mundemba and Isangele.

Geography 
The division borders the Federal Republic of Nigeria to the west, Fako division to the south, Manyu division to the north and Meme and Kupe Muanenguba divisions to the east. A mangroves and creeks dominated estuary forms a very low and indented point of contact with the sea in the Rio del Rey estuary. This is in the easternmost part of the Gulf of Guinea known as the Bight of Biafra and which makes up over 35% of Ndian division. This estuary also forms the delta zone of the Ndian River with enormous ongoing marine erosion due to offshore oil drilling. Apart from this amphibious area which is dominated by mangroves and creeks, over 25% of the land surface is flat while about 40%, rests on the Rumpi Highlands.

Population 
From a 2005 population survey and future projections, the population of Ndian division is estimated at 362201 of which 17% are semi-urban and 83% rural.

Climate 
The area has two seasons which are, a dry season from November to April and a rainy season from May to October. Temperature varies little throughout the year with mean monthly maximum temperatures in the dry season being  and in the rainy season .

The relative humidity is high during most of the year with minimum monthly values ranging between 60% and 98% in Dikome Balue (east) and Toko (north) areas and between 50% and 84% in Mundemba (west) and Ekondo Titi (south) areas. Nevertheless, high velocities and magnitudes sometimes occur especially during the passage of squall lines associated with large rainy seasons or regular thunderstorms. These winds usually blow from a southwest to west direction.

The People 
Predominantly Oroko people such as Balue, Ngolo, Bima, Isangele, Balondo, Batanga,  and the Efik tribe , and who speak similar Bantu languages populate this area. The Balue, Ngolo, Bima and Batanga people inhabit the mountainous forest areas where shifting cultivation, hunting and gathering of non-timber forest products (NTFPs) are important activities for the local villagers.

Meanwhile, the Isangele, Balondo and Efik are found in the low-lying and maritime areas where they are mostly involved in various agricultural, petty trading and fishing activities. Christianity is the major form of religious worship in Ndian division though many people adhere to their animist beliefs.

Ecology 
Here, the herb layer is closed and may often attain heights above . The canopy is usually full of climbers and the cloud forests appearance is as a result of the ever present epiphytes. These broad-leaved evergreen and deciduous trees are branched at low heights with irregular stem shapes. These sub-montane forests are not of great interest for commercial timber exploitation due to very steep slopes hence inaccessibility and the few timber species have very irregular stem structure.
 
In the easily accessible lowland forests, artisanal logging has occurred over the past decades and has led to regrowth fields and monocrop plantations. Almost all these areas were first used for shifting cultivation by the local farming population for subsistence purposes before being abandoned or converted into monocrop plantations.

Here, shifting cultivation and agroforestry farming have created fields, weed infested thickets and secondary forest vegetation mostly along the main roads and around villages. These combined reverts to dense and secondary forests have given rise to a mosaic forested landscape with bushes of devil weed or achakasara (Chromolaena odorata) and umbrella tree (Musanga cecropioides).  

It is followed by burning of the slash at the end of the dry season (February/March) and planting at the onset of the rainy season (April/May). This practice involves the planting of a variety and a combination of crops at the same time and on the same piece of land. These are primary and staple food crops such as cassava, cocoyam, banana and plantain, peanuts, maize and yams.

Traditionally, cocoa (Theobroma cacao) has been the most important cash crop although oil palm (Elaeis guineensis) and coffee (Coffea arabica and Coffea canephora) have usually been cultivated. But recently, large expanses of commercial plantations of oil palm and rubber (Hevea brasiliensis) have been established in the area.

Subdivisions

The department is divided administratively into 9 communes and in turn into villages.

Communes:

 Bamusso
 Dikome-Balue
 Ekondo-Titi
 Idabato
 Isanguele
 Kombo-Abedimo
 Kombo-Itindi
 Mundemba
 Toko

References

Sources

Departments of Cameroon
Southwest Region (Cameroon)